Steffi Graf was the defending champion but did not compete that year.

Martina Hingis won in the final 6–2, 6–1 against Monica Seles. At 16 years and 6 months, Hingis became the youngest World no. 1 player in the history of the WTA. This marked the first time that neither Graf, Seles nor Arantxa Sánchez Vicario were ranked No. 1 since August 17, 1987.

Seeds
A champion seed is indicated in bold text while text in italics indicates the round in which that seed was eliminated. All thirty-two seeds received a bye to the second round.

 Martina Hingis (champion)
 Arantxa Sánchez Vicario (fourth round)
 Jana Novotná (semifinals)
 Monica Seles (final)
 Lindsay Davenport (fourth round)
 Anke Huber (third round)
 Irina Spîrlea (quarterfinals)
 Iva Majoli (quarterfinals)
 Karina Habšudová (second round)
 Mary Joe Fernández (quarterfinals)
 Barbara Paulus (semifinals)
 Amanda Coetzer (second round)
 Judith Wiesner (third round)
 Kimberly Po (third round)
 Brenda Schultz-McCarthy (second round)
 Elena Likhovtseva (fourth round)
 Nathalie Tauziat (third round)
 Magdalena Maleeva (third round)
 Sabine Appelmans (third round)
 Ruxandra Dragomir (third round)
 Chanda Rubin (fourth round)
 Lisa Raymond (third round)
 Jennifer Capriati (second round)
 Sandrine Testud (quarterfinals)
 Ai Sugiyama (third round)
 Dominique Van Roost (second round)
 Amy Frazier (third round)
 Linda Wild (second round)
 Katarína Studeníková (third round)
 Åsa Carlsson (fourth round)
 Henrieta Nagyová (third round)
 Barbara Schett (fourth round)

Draw

Finals

Top half

Section 1

Section 2

Section 3

Section 4

Bottom half

Section 5

Section 6

Section 7

Section 8

References
 1997 Lipton Championships Draw

Women's Singles
Singles